Tiskilwa is a village in Bureau County, Illinois, United States. The population was 740 at the 2020 census. It is part of the Ottawa Micropolitan Statistical Area.

Exelon Wind, a division of Exelon Power, owns and operates the Illinois Wind AgriWind Project in Tiskilwa.

History

Early history 

Founded in 1834, Tiskilwa emerged as a regional economic and cultural center integrating its own administrative capacities, schools, churches and shops serving a small population of townspeople and farm families from the surrounding . It was a small community whose center was three blocks of Main Street around which were located its churches, cafes, taverns, grocery stores, beauty parlors, barbershops and other businesses.

History of Tiskilwa High School 

The high school was deactivated in 1996.  The high school aged students from Tiskilwa now attend Princeton High School (Illinois). The grade school is now the property of the Princeton Elementary School District and now houses the Bureau Marshall Putnam counties' special education cooperative (BMP), and the Bureau County Special Schools Bureau Educational Support Team (BEST Program), a public K-12 alternative school.
 
School buildings in Tiskilwa date to 1838.  A newer building was built in 1850 and an updated building in 1868.  In 1978 the building still standing today was built and closed with the deactivation of the school system in 1996. The first class to graduate high school from Tiskilwa did so in 1878 with a graduating class membership of two.

Festivals

Strawberry Festival 

Tiskilwa's Strawberry and Artisan Festival is held on the second Saturday in June; it celebrates Tiskilwa's strawberry season and showcases area artists. The festival offers fresh berries and strawberry shortcake, live entertainment, children's activities and food vendors in downtown Tiskilwa from late morning through early afternoon. It typically coincides with town-wide garage sales.

Pow Wow Days 

Tiskilwa celebrates Pow Wow Days every year the first weekend in August. This is a three-day event with a community concert or big band dancing, children's "Muttin Bustin Rodeo", a parade, a Native American pow wow, a beer garden, 4-H Club and cheerleader-sponsored food stands, church-sponsored lunches, historical tours, antique automobiles and tractors, and other events. Pow Wow Days was founded in 1976 as part of the national bicentennial.

Geography
Tiskilwa is located at  (41.291664, -89.506462).

Demographics

As of the 2020 census there were 740 people, 298 households, and 191 families residing in the village. The racial makeup of the village was 92.43% White, 0.27% African American, 0.41% Asian, 0.41% from other races, and 6.49% from two or more races. Hispanic or Latino of any race were 2.30% of the population.

There were 298 households, out of which 43.62% had children under the age of 18 living with them, 45.64% were married couples living together, 10.07% had a female householder with no husband present, and 35.91% were non-families. 34.56% of all households were made up of individuals, and 20.13% had someone living alone who was 65 years of age or older. The average household size was 2.92 and the average family size was 2.33.

The village's age distribution consisted of 22.7% under the age of 18, 9.5% from 18 to 24, 16.4% from 25 to 44, 28.9% from 45 to 64, and 22.4% who were 65 years of age or older. The median age was 46.6 years. For every 100 females, there were 96.3 males. For every 100 females age 18 and over, there were 88.7 males.

The median income for a household in the village was $41,071, and the median income for a family was $53,250. Males had a median income of $40,139 versus $21,375 for females. The per capita income for the village was $22,328. About 17.3% of families and 21.8% of the population were below the poverty line, including 30.6% of those under age 18 and 12.3% of those age 65 or over.

Notable Persons
 Warren Giles, professional baseball executive, born in Tiskilwa
Charles Torrey Simpson, botanist, malacologist and conservationist
 Lilian Whiting, journalist, editor, and author of poetry and short stories

References

Further reading
 When Tiskilwa Was Young (1985), Mary B. Steimle

External links
 Tiskilwa Historical Society
 Tiskilwa Public Library
 Tiskilwa Train Derailment

Villages in Bureau County, Illinois
Villages in Illinois
Ottawa, IL Micropolitan Statistical Area
Populated places established in 1834
1834 establishments in Illinois